The 1951 Svenska Cupen final took place on 22 July 1951 at Råsunda in Solna. It was contested between Allsvenskan sides Malmö FF and Djurgårdens IF. Djurgården played their first cup final ever, Malmö FF played their first final since 1947 and their fifth final in total. Malmö FF won their fourth title with a 2–1 victory.

Match details

External links
Svenska Cupen at svenskfotboll.se

Cup
1951
Malmö FF matches
Djurgårdens IF Fotboll matches
Football in Stockholm
July 1951 sports events in Europe